The 2006–07 season is Fussball Club Basel 1893's 114th in existence and the club's 13th consecutive season in the top flight of Swiss football. FCB played their home matches in the St. Jakob-Park, in the Basel quarter St. Alban in the south-east of the city. After four season as Basel's chairman Werner Edelmann stood down and Mrs Gisela Oeri was voted as the club's very first chairwoman at the AGM.

Overview
Christian Gross was head coach for the eighth successive season. Ahead of the new season Basel made a number of transfers. The most notable was the replacement of Swiss international goalkeeper Pascal Zuberbühler, who transferred to West Bromwich Albion, with the Argentinian international Franco Costanzo who came from Deportivo Alavés. Delron Buckley was signed on loan from Borussia Dortmund. Cristiano dos Santos Rodrigues was signed in from Roda JC and Franz Burgmeier was signed in from FC Aarau. 

Other players who transferred out were Matias Emilio Delgado who went to Beşiktaş Istanbul. Djamel Mesbah and Samuele Preisig both moved onto FC Aarau and both on a free transfer. Zdravko Kuzmanović left the club during the winter break for Fiorentina. Mikhail Kavelashvili also left the club in the winter break and retired from his active football career.

FCB started the season with various warm-up matches. These included teams from the Swiss lower league as well as teams from France, Croatia and the Ukraine. The FC Basel had set three aims for the 2006–07 season, these were to win back the league and cup titles and thirdly to stay in the UEFA Cup over the winter break.

Franco Costanzo was voted to player of season

The Campaign

Domestic League
Following the last minute loss of the 2005–06 Super League Championship as a result of the 1–2 home defeat against FC Zürich on 13 May 2006 and the subsequent riots, the so-called Basel Hooligan Incident, the club had to carry consequences. As well as the big fine, the first two home games of the 2006–07 Super League season were held completely without fans, as so called "ghost matches". The following three matches were held with just a part of the stadium capacity, without the fans from the "Muttenzer Kurve" (the eastern fan block).

There were ten teams competing in the top tier 2006–07 Swiss Super League. The teams played a double round-robin in the first half of the season and then another double round-robin in the second half. There were three points for a victory and one each for a draw. The champions would enter the third qualifying round of the 2007–08 UEFA Champions League. The championship runners-up would enter the UEFA Cup second qualifying round. The third placed team would enter the UEFA Cup first qualifying round. The bottom placed team would be relegated, the second last team would play a play-off against relegation.

Following a very poor start to the season, five defeats in the first ten rounds, Basel were ten championship points behind the table leaders. They started a catch up race after the winter break and finished the league campaign as runners-up, just one point behind champions FC Zürich. This was despite the fact that they defeated Zürich in three of the four direct matches during that league season. Basel missed their championship aim.

Domestic Cup
FC Liestal 
In the early rounds of the 2006–07 Swiss Cup Basel were drawn with away games against lower league teams. Basel started in the third round against local team FC Liestal. Cristiano dos Santos Rodrigues played his team debut on 26 August 2006 in the Cup match against local club FC Liestal. He scored three goals for his new club, during the first 27 minutes of the game, as Basel advanced with the end score 6–1 to the next round. Delron Buckley (19), captain Ivan Ergić (20) and Daniel Majstorović (66) scored the other goals. It was also Majstorović who was responsible for the final result with an own goal in the 70th minute. 

AC Lugano
In the second-round opponents were second tier Lugano. Basel clearly won this tie as well 4–0 and goal scorers were Delron Buckley, Filipe Caicedo, Mladen Petrić and Franz Burgmeier, whereas the last three goals weren't scored until the last 15 minutes of the match. The match was noted as being very rough, referee René Rogalla showed the yellow card to five Lugano players.

FC Baulmes
However, in the third-round game on 12 November away against second tier FC Baulmes extra time was needed before the tie was decided. Basel played a bad first half, Bruno Berner had to clear a ball off the line, with goalkeeper Franco Costanzo already beaten. Head coach Christian Gross made three early substitutions, but despite these changes, the hosts went two goals up in the 72nd minute. Filipe Caicedo, who had been substituted in at half time, reacted quickly and scored within a minute and Mladen Petrić equalised within another few minutes. During the extra time the hosts were visibly tired and Mile Sterjovski was able to score the winning goal for the visitors.

FC Aarau
After the New Year, the quarterfinal was a home tie against FC Aarau on the 14 March 2007. The match was decided very early, Mile Sterjovski netted the first attacking move in the first minute of the game. Aarau tried everything afterwards to get level. Goalkeeper Franco Costanzo had a good day and made good saves. Aarau complained for a penalty as Demetrio Greco was brought down five minutes from the end, but referee Sascha Kever did not blow his whistle. Two minutes into the over-time nearly the decider, but Eren Derdiyok's shot hit the post. Four minutes into the over-time Costanzo made another good save and Basel were through to the next round.

FC Wil
The semifinal was an away tie against FC Wil on 26 April. Basel took the lead 5 minutes before half-time as Scott Chipperfield netted and Franz Burgmeier netted the second five minutes after the break. Kristian Nushi pulled one back for the home team after 57 minutes. But Delron Buckley put his side two goals ahead again some 10 minutes later. This was the final score and Basel advanced to the final

FC Luzern
The Final took place at Stade de Suisse, Wankdorf in Bern on Whit Monday 28 May 2007 in front of 30,000 spectators. Basel won the Cup by beating Luzern 1–0. 

Most of the time it was a close game, Basel controlled the game, both teams had chances. Luzern's keeper David Zibung became the tragic hero in the sold-out Stade de Suisse in Bern, who, according to the interpretation of referee Nicole Petignat, in the 90th minute pulled Scott Chipperfield off his feet. Zibung was sent off and Besnik Zukaj was substituted in. The winning goal came from the penalty spot through Daniel Majstorović in the 93rd minute, Zukaj had no chance of saving it. Basel manager Christian Gross said the game afterwards: "We really didn't have an easy task with FC Luzern, they managed to close the room very well." 

Conclusion
Basel had missed the championship just four days earlier, but they achieved their aim of winning the cup on this Whit Monday.

Europe
FC Basel's European campaign started in the first qualifying stage of the UEFA Cup, here they beat Kazakhi side FC Tobol 3–1 on aggregate. In the second qualifying round they drawn against FC Vaduz from Liechtenstein, narrowly progressing on the away goals rule after a 2–2 aggregate draw. In the first round of the competition Basel were drawn against Macedonians FK Rabotnički. Basel won 6–2 at St. Jakob-Park and 1–0 at the Skopje City Stadium. Thus they qualified for the group stages where they faced tough opposition. Together with Blackburn Rovers of England, AS Nancy of France, Feyenoord of The Netherlands and Wisła Kraków of Poland, Basel were drawn into Group E. In the Group stage, the teams played a single round-robin, each with two home games.

Feyenoord
Basel's first game was at home against Feyenoord. The Dutch side were second best for much of the game and the only surprise was that it took Basel an hour before they edged ahead. A draw had looked highly unlikely for much of the match and goalkeeper Henk Timmer was the busiest man on the field. Mladen Petrić, Scott Chipperfield and Mile Sterjovski all had shots at his goal in the opening 12 minutes. With more accuracy Petrić could have had a hat-trick inside 20 minutes, as he headed wide and then drove over the crossbar. Basel dominated the match and it was not a surprise as Eduardo struck on the hour, tapping in after Timmer could only parry Petrić's shot. Stein Huysegems came off the substitutes' bench to earn Feyenoord a 1-1 draw with a goal within five minutes of coming on and with only 14 minutes remaining. The last action belonged to Timmer, who acrobatically kept out Petrić's free-kick as the Dutch side held on. 

Blackburn Rovers
Their next group match was an away tie at Ewood Park against Blackburn Rovers. Basel played reasonably well but shaky defending towards the end of the game sealed their downfall. Australian defender Lucas Neill had the first goal chance for the home team after four minutes, but goalkeeper Franco Costanzo held. Turckish midfielder Tugay Kerimoğlu tried an overhead kick after eight minutes, but it went far off. Zdravko Kuzmanović saw the yellow card just after that, but only the referee knew why. Morten Gamst Pedersen tried a wide range shot one minute later again Costanzo held. Eduardo had Basel's first chance, the Blackburn defence could clear, but it went off for a corner. There was a great chance after Eduardo crossed, but Mladen Petrić put the ball next to the goal. 32nd Minute offside, a clear wrong decision, as Eduardo started off alone towards the Blackburn goal. There were chances on both sides. Blackburn had 20 attempts, 11 of which on target. Basel had ten, but only four on target. 15 minutes from time Tugay Kerimoğlu scored in the top left corner with a good 25 meter Sunday shot. The disastrous referee Oleh Oriekhov gave a penalty against Basel after a clear dive and Francis Jeffers scored from the spot in the 90th minute. Benni McCarthy added a third goal in the third minute of over time as the defence over saw him.

AS Nancy
Their next opponents were AS Nancy in a home game at the St. Jakob-Park on 23 November. Basel went behind twice, but were able to draw level both times. Basel had two early chances, captain Ivan Ergić in the 14th minute and another in the 21st, but the game started rather slow. It exploded into life just after the half-hour when Monsef Zerka broke down the right for the French team and cut into the area before laying off a perfectly weighted pass for Kim, who finished off nicely. The lead did not quite correspond to the course of the game. The Basel response was immediate, Reto Zanni supplying Scott Chipperfield as the Australian international broke from midfield to fire past Olivier Sorin from inside the area. But Nancy were back in front within two minutes. Pascal Berenguer curled in a superb free-kick after he had been upended by Papa Malick Ba. After the restart, Basel pressed for the second equaliser through a shot from Kōji Nakata. Parity was restored, however, on 56 minutes as Mile Sterjovski got the final touch to a free-kick from the influential Mladen Petrić. Basel were pushing for the winning goal, as during the last minute of the game they were caught by a counterattack. Goalkeeper Franco Costanzo was only able to stop the Nancy attack by fouling Issiar Dia, which resulted in his sending off and a penalty against Basel. They had already used all three substitutes, therefore striker Mladen Petrić donned the goalkeeper shirt and stood between the posts. He was able to save the penalty kick taken by Mickaël Chrétien, thus helping his team to the 2–2 draw.

Wisła Kraków
Basel's last group game was played away against Wisła Kraków at the Wisła Stadium. FCB needed a win to qualify for the next round. The hosts had the first good chance, but Basel started better into the game. Basel's striker Mladen Petrić netted the first goal after a corner in the 8th minute. Daniel Majstorović header was a very good pass and Petrić easily pushed the ball over the line. Wisla, who lost the other three games in the grouüp stage, but had scored one goal in each, pressed hard and scored the equaliser within just two minutes. Paweł Brożek pushed the ball between goalkeeper Louis Crayton legs in their next attack. Paweł Brożek then had another three or four good chances before the half time whistle from Hungarian referee Viktor Kassai. In the second period  Wisła central defender Cléber saw a yellow card for a foul in the 46th minute. Then midfielder Radosław Sobolewski saw a yellow card in the 50th minute and five minutes later he had a good chance, but he took a hand to help and the referee had seen this. Paweł Brożek's twin brother and striking campagnion Piotr Brożek had had a good first half, but after the break he wasn't in the game any longer and was substituted out after 67 minutes. His replacement was Jean Paulista and he had the first good scene in the second half and scored Wisla's second goal on 71 minutes. Paweł Brożek then had another good chance in the 80th minute. Crayton rescues sensationally, but remained somewhat dazed lying on the pitch, because Brozek did not jump up properly and accidentally hit him on the head with his boot. Paweł Brożek became man of the match just three minutes later as he took the pass from Jakub Błaszczykowski and netted the team's third goal, for Wisla to win, with the end result 3–1.

Conclusion
Basel's poor European campaign came to an end after losing 3–1 to Wisla, despite taking an early lead. Basel missed their aim to remain in European competition over the winter break. Despite everything, it was a disappointing European campaign.

Club

The Management

Kit

|
|

Other information

Players

First team squad

Multiple Nationality
 1   Franco Costanzo
 5   Daniel Majstorović
 9   Marko Perović
 10   Mladen Petrić
 11   Scott Chipperfield
 17   Ivan Rakitić
 18   Louis Crayton
 22   Ivan Ergić
 31   Eren Derdiyok

Transfers summer 2006

In

Out

Transfers winter 2006–07

In

Out

Results and fixtures

Friendlies

Pre- and mid-season friendlies

Winter break and mid-season friendlies

Swiss Super League

First half of season

Second half of season

Final league table

Swiss Cup

2006–07 Swiss Cup

UEFA Cup

Qualifying rounds

Basel won 3–1 on aggregate.

2-2 on aggregate, Basel win on away goals

First round 

Basel won 7–2 on aggregate.

Group stage / Group E

Group E table

References

Sources
 Rotblau: Jahrbuch Saison 2015/2016. Publisher: FC Basel Marketing AG. 
 Rotblau: Jahrbuch Saison 2017/2018. Publisher: FC Basel Marketing AG. 
 Die ersten 125 Jahre / 2018. Publisher: Josef Zindel im Friedrich Reinhardt Verlag, Basel. 
 FCB squad 2006–07 at fcb-archiv.ch
 Switzerland 2006–07 at RSSSF

External links
 FC Basel official site
 football.ch

FC Basel seasons
Basel